This page lists all of Víctor Manuelle's album and singles, including information such as record sales and chart positions.
He has sold over 2 million copies in United States and over 6 million copies worldwide.

Albums

Studio albums

Live albums

Compilation albums

Singles

Guest singles

References

Discographies of Puerto Rican artists
Latin pop music discographies
Tropical music discographies